Deniss Tjapkin (born 30 January 1991) is an Estonian professional footballer who plays as a centre back for Estonian Esiliiga B club FC Tallinn.

International career
Tjapkin made his senior international debut for Estonia on 19 November 2017, in a 2–0 away victory against Fiji in a friendly.

Honours

Club
Nõmme Kalju
Meistriliiga: 2018

References

External links

1991 births
Living people
Sportspeople from Kohtla-Järve
Estonian footballers
Estonian people of Russian descent
Association football defenders
Esiliiga players
FC Lootus Kohtla-Järve players
Meistriliiga players
JK Sillamäe Kalev players
Nõmme Kalju FC players
Estonia youth international footballers
Estonia international footballers